Oxmoor Center is a Louisville, Kentucky shopping mall located at 7900 Shelbyville Road in eastern Louisville.

History

The 1970s 
Opened on February 8, 1971 on the opposing side of the Watterson Expressway from Mall St. Matthews, the mall originally had Shillito's and Stewart's as its anchor stores. In July 1984 the mall opened a new wing over the Middle Fork of Beargrass Creek to include a Sears store that relocated from 4121 Shelbyville Road.

The land the mall was built on is a part of Oxmoor Farm and, due to the land being inherited as a trust which stipulated that it not be sold for a certain number of years, was leased to the mall. The deed restriction has since expired which led to the development of Oxmoor Woods  subdivision, but the mall does not own the land it sits upon and remains a leaseholder.

The Shillito's store, at the mall's east end, was three stories, and included a small restaurant on the third floor. The mall featured a Stewart's department store on its west end. A Yudofsky Furriers store was adjacent to Stewart's (the last store before Stewart's on the south side). The central atrium had a large circular fountain.

Oxmoor Center once had a Putters Park on the upper level, along with four cinema screens. Other upper level tenants included Farrell's Ice Cream Parlour, Something to Do (a games store now known as Something2Do, which remained in the mall until moving out in July 2014), Modelle's Custom Tailors (still operating at the lower level) and Athlete's Foot. Lower level tenants included Lerner's (women's clothing), a tobacco shop (with a wooden Indian statue, also still in business), a candle store, a small store selling imported gifts called Far East and Thom McAn Shoes. By the 1980s, there were six cinematic auditoriums in operation at Oxmoor Center. The original two larger auditoriums located on the ground floor level (in the northern half of today's Old Navy) had been joined by four smaller screens located on the second floor of the Oxmoor Mall.

1980s – present
Shillito's was rebranded as Shillito Rikes in June 1982, Lazarus in March 1986, Lazarus-Macy's in August 2003 and Macy's in March 2005. Stewart's would be rebannered six times between November 1985 and September 2003. The store operated as an L.S. Ayres, Ben Snyder's, Hess's, Jacobson's and Von Maur, its most recent conversion. The Famous Blue Boar Cafeteria, a 1971 charter tenant, closed in 1995 along with Rax.

A food court was created on the mall's upper level in 1989. In 1997, a 2-level Kohl's opened next to the mall. The following year, a major reconstruction on the mall was completed. It included a new octagonal main entrance, vaulted ceilings, escalators and an updated north facade. In October 2001, Galyan's Trading Company opened a new, 2-level store that was built in the front parking area. It became a Dick's Sporting Goods location in October 2004 after Dick's purchased the Galyan's chain.

The retail hub is currently owned by Brookfield Properties.

In January 2013, the mall announced a major renovation in which the center mezzanine containing the food court and a few retailers would be torn down and replaced with a new center court. The renovation, which added new seating areas plus a play area near the Sears store, was completed in time for the 2013 Christmas shopping season. 

On October 6, 2017, Sears announced that their Oxmoor Center location would be closing on January 14, 2018.

References

Further reading

External links 
Oxmoor Center Official web site

Economy of Louisville, Kentucky
Shopping malls in Kentucky
Brookfield Properties
Buildings and structures in Louisville, Kentucky
Tourist attractions in Louisville, Kentucky
Shopping malls established in 1971